Ropica subnotata is a species of beetle in the family Cerambycidae. It was described by Pic in 1925.

References

External links
Photograph of R. subnotata

subnotata
Beetles described in 1925